The Bandırma Ferry Terminal ) or Bandırma Pier is a ferry terminal in Bandırma, Turkey, located within the Port of Bandırma on the Marmara Sea. It is used by İDO, which operates ferry service from Bandırma to Yenikapı in Istanbul.

The terminal opened in 1998, when İDO began operating ferry service to Bandırma. Connections to intercity train service to İzmir are available via Bandırma station, located adjacent to the terminal.

The terminal is located in the Ayyıldız neighborhood, just southeast of the city center, on the east side of the Port of Bandırma.

References

Ferry terminals in Turkey
Transport in Balıkesir Province
1998 establishments in Turkey
Bandırma
Buildings and structures in Balıkesir Province